Ewing Christian College (ECC), formerly Allahabad Christian College, is an autonomous constituent college of University of Allahabad, located in Allahabad, India.

The college was established in 1902 by Arthur Henry Ewing, a prominent Presbyterian missionary, as an initiative of the East India Company.

The college was conferred with the status of College with Potential for Excellence by the University Grants Commission in 2005 and accredited by the National Assessment and Accreditation Council (NAAC).

Campus

The campus is located on the northern bank of the Yamuna river near Sangam on the southern part of Allahabad city.

Academics
The academic structure is composed of three faculties, the Faculty of Arts, Faculty of Science and Faculty of Teacher education, which are subdivided into various departments and eight self-financed centers/departments.

Notable alumni
 Surya Bahadur Thapa, 24th Prime Minister of Nepal (1963, 1965, 1979, 1997, 2003)
 Govind Swarup, Radio Astrophysicist
 Shanti Bhushan, Law Minister of India (1977–79)
 Keshavrao Krishnarao Datey (1912-1983), Cardiologist
 Feroze Gandhi, Member of Parliament (1952–60)
 Ravindra Khattree, Statistician
 Madan Lal Khurana, Chief Minister of Delhi (1993–96)
 Panchanan Maheshwari, botanist, Fellow of the Royal Society
 J. S. Verma, Chief Justice of India (1997–98)
 Kamal Narain Singh, Chief Justice of India (1991-1991)
 Uma Nath Singh, Chief Justice of Meghalaya High Court
 Manuel Aaron, Chess Player
 Aisha Saeed, Indian Statistical Service
 Suraj Kumar Shukla, Indian Statistical Service
Raghvendra Pandey, Indian Statistical Service
 Kaushlendra Vikram Singh, Indian Administrative Service
 Dr. Gopal Dixit, Associate Professor, IIT Bombay

References

External links
 Official website
 Facebook page

Universities and colleges in Allahabad
University of Allahabad
Educational institutions established in 1902
1902 establishments in India